Gabino Rodríguez (1927 – 25 August 1998) was a Mexican cyclist. He competed in the individual and team road race events at the 1948 Summer Olympics.

References

External links
 

1927 births
1998 deaths
Mexican male cyclists
Olympic cyclists of Mexico
Cyclists at the 1948 Summer Olympics
Place of birth missing